Arenal Volcano Emergency Forest Reserve is a Forest Reserve, part of the Arenal Huetar Norte Conservation Area, in the northern part of Costa Rica in the emergency zone of the Arenal Volcano. It was created in 1972 covering an area of forest, and there are no public facilities at the reserve.

References

External links 
 Arenal Volcano Emergency Forest Reserve at Costa Rica National Parks

Nature reserves in Costa Rica
Geography of Alajuela Province
Forests of Costa Rica
Forest reserves